The following is a timeline of the history of the city of Tours, France.

Prior to 18th century

 1st C. – Construction of the Tours Amphitheatre. Population approx. 6,000.
 2nd C. – Tours amphitheatre expanded
 3rd C. – Roman Catholic diocese of Tours established.
 250 – Tours Amphitheatre turned into a fortification
 327 - Marmoutier Abbey founded.
 360 – Castrum added to the area around the fortified amphitheatre.
 371 – Martin of Tours becomes bishop.
 5th C. – Caesarodunum renamed "Civitas Turonorum."
 435 – Tours "affiliated to the Armorican confederation."  Ecclesiastical province of Tours established.
 461 – Religious Council of Tours held.
 473 – Visigoths in power.
 567 – Second Council of Tours held.
 573 – Gregory of Tours becomes bishop.
 732 – Battle of Tours fought nearby.
 796
 Marmoutier Abbey scriptorium active (approximate date).
 Charlemagne put Marmoutier Abbey into the care of Alcuin of York.
 813 – Third Council of Tours held.
 10th C. – City walls of Châteauneuf built around basilica of St. Martin.
 853 & 903 - Normans pilaged.
 998 – Fire.
 11th C. – Château de Tours built.
 11th–12th C. – Church of St Martin built.
 1034 –  (bridge) built (approximate date).
 1055 – Council of Tours held.
 1163 – Council of Tours (1163) held.
 1170 – Tours Cathedral construction begins.
 1203 – Livre tournois became the official currency of the kingdom.
 1236 –  held.
 1308 – Estates General of Tours (1308) held.
 ca.1420 - Jean Fouquet, painter, was born in Tours.
 1444 – Treaty of Tours. Tours became capital de facto of France.
 1460 – Touraine customary laws codified.
 1464 – Louis XI, the "universal spider", created the system of royal postal roads, first roads started from Tours.
 1468 – Estates General of Tours (1468) held.
 1484 – Estates General of Tours (1484) held.
 1506 – Estates General of Tours (1506) held.
 1542 – Généralité of Tours created (included Touraine, Maine and Anjou).
 1547 - Tours Cathedral building completed.
 1562 – Religious unrest.
 1589 – Treaty of Plessis-les-Tours.
 1594 – Parliament of Tours returned to Paris. Kings definitely returned to Paris area.

18th century
 1761 –  established.
 1778 –  built.
 1790 – Tours becomes part of the Indre-et-Loire souveraineté.
 1798 – Church of St Martin demolished.
 1799 – 20 May: Birth of Honoré de Balzac.

19th century
 1800 – Population: 20,240.
 1801 – , -Centre, and -Nord created.
 1803 – Chamber of Commerce established.
 1840 –  founded.
 1843 – Jardin botanique de Tours (garden) founded.
 1846 - Tours station opened.
 1855 - Tours Amphitheatre rediscovered.
 1858 – Tours–Le Mans railway begins operating.
 1861 – Population: 41,061.
 1867 – Union Libérale newspaper begins publication.
 1870 – Tours becomes temporary "seat of French government, during siege of Paris."
 1872 –  built.
 1877 –  begins operating.
 1886 – Population: 59,585.
 1889 – Tours Municipal Theatre reopened after fire.
 1898 – Gare de Tours (rail station) built.

20th century

 1904 –  built.
 1906 - Population: 67,601. 
 1911 – Population: 73,398.
 1917 – American Expeditionary Forces' "chief supply base" set up at Tours (approximate date), during World War I.
 1924 – Basilica of St. Martin, Tours rebuilt.
 1949 –  begins operating.
 1957 –  (library) built.
 1962 – Population: 92,944.
 1968 –  established.
 1969 – François Rabelais University founded.
 1978
 Stade de la Vallée du Cher (stadium) opens.
 Musée des Equipages Militaires et du Train (museum) established.
 1982 – Tours becomes part of the Centre-Val de Loire region.
 1999 – Population: 132,820.

21st century

 2011 – Population: 134,633.
 2013 – Tours tramway begins operating.
 2014
 March:  held.
 Serge Babary becomes mayor.

See also
 Tours history
  (Roman-era settlement)
 
 
  region

Other cities in the Centre-Val de Loire region:
 Timeline of Bourges
 Timeline of Orléans

References

This article incorporates information from the French Wikipedia.

Bibliography

in English

in French

External links

 Items related to Tours, various dates (via Europeana).
 Items related to Tours, various dates (via Digital Public Library of America).

Years in France
tours